United Nations Security Council Resolution 42, adopted on March 5, 1948, called upon the permanent members of the Council to consult and inform it regarding the situation in Palestine and to make recommendations to the United Nations Palestine Commission.  The Resolution also appealed to all governments and peoples, particularly those around Palestine to aid the situation in any way possible.

The resolution was adopted with eight votes to none and abstentions from Argentina, Syria and the United Kingdom.

See also
 List of United Nations Security Council Resolutions 1 to 100 (1946–1953)

References
Text of the Resolution at undocs.org

External links
 

 0042
 0042
Israeli–Palestinian conflict and the United Nations
1948 in Israel
March 1948 events